Annów may refer to the following places:
Annów, Poddębice County in Łódź Voivodeship (central Poland)
Annów, Tomaszów Mazowiecki County in Łódź Voivodeship (central Poland)
Annów, Lublin Voivodeship (east Poland)
Annów, Masovian Voivodeship (east-central Poland)